Howmeh Rural District is a rural district (dehestan) in the Central District of Damghan County, Semnan Province, Iran. At the 2006 census, its population was 4,318, in 1,261 families.  The rural district has 31 villages.

References 

Rural Districts of Semnan Province
Damghan County